Men's freestyle 60 kilograms competition at the 2012 Summer Olympics in London, United Kingdom, took place on 11 August at ExCeL London.
This freestyle wrestling competition consisted of a single-elimination tournament, with a repechage used to determine the winners of two bronze medals. The two finalists faced off for gold and silver medals. Each wrestler who lost to one of the two finalists moved into the repechage, culminating in a pair of bronze medal matches featuring the semifinal losers each facing the remaining repechage opponent from their half of the bracket.

Each bout consisted of up to three rounds, lasting two minutes apiece. The wrestler who scored more points in each round was the winner of that rounds; the bout finished when one wrestler had won two rounds (and thus the match).

On 29 August 2016, a report indicated that a retested sample for silver medalist Besik Kudukhov taken at the time of this event had returned a positive result (later disclosed as dehydrochlormethyltestosterone). On 27 October 2016, the IOC stated that they were unaware that Kudukhov had died in a  car accident in December 2013 at the time the decision to include his samples in the re-analysis process was made. Since such proceedings cannot be conducted against a deceased person, the IOC dropped all disciplinary proceedings against him. As a result, Olympic results that would most likely have been reviewed will remain uncorrected.

Schedule
All times are British Summer Time (UTC+01:00)

Results
Legend
F — Won by fall

Final

Top half

Bottom half

Repechage

Final standing

References

Page 18

Wrestling at the 2012 Summer Olympics
Men's events at the 2012 Summer Olympics